Nemetsky District (lit. German district) may refer to:
Nemetsky National District, a district of Altai Krai, Russia
Azovsky Nemetsky National District, a district of Omsk Oblast, Russia
German Quarter (Nemetskaya sloboda), a historical neighborhood in Moscow, Russia